Gregg David Garrity (born November 24, 1960) is a former professional American football wide receiver who played in the National Football League (NFL) for the Pittsburgh Steelers and the Philadelphia Eagles. He played college football at Penn State University, and played high school football at North Allegheny High School in Wexford, PA. He was drafted in the fifth round of the 1983 NFL Draft.

Garrity is notable for a diving catch in the end zone that helped the Nittany Lions clinch their first national title over Georgia, a feat that landed him on the cover of Sports Illustrated.

References

1960 births
Living people
American football wide receivers
Penn State Nittany Lions football players
Philadelphia Eagles players
Pittsburgh Steelers players
Players of American football from Pittsburgh